Bursera graveolens, known in Spanish as  ("holy stick”), is a wild tree native from the Yucatán Peninsula to Peru and Venezuela.

Bursera graveolens is found in the seasonally dry tropical forests of Peru, Venezuela, Colombia, Ecuador, Panama, Costa Rica, Nicaragua, Honduras, Guatemala, and El Salvador, and on the Galápagos Islands. The tree belongs to the same family (Burseraceae) as frankincense and myrrh. It is widely used in ritual purification and as folk medicine for stomach ache, as a sudorific, and as liniment for rheumatism. Aged heartwood is rich in terpenes such as limonene and α-terpineol.

Conservation
In 2006, the government of Peru listed Bursera graveolens as "In Critical Danger" (En Peligro Critico (CR)) under Decree 043-2006-AG, banning the cutting of live trees and allowing only for the collection of naturally fallen or dead trees. However, in 2014, it was removed from the SERFOR (National Forest and Wildlife Service) list of protected species.

Illegal logging is a regular occurrence in northwestern Peru due to high demand. In 2010, the International Union for Conservation of Nature (IUCN) stated Bursera graveolens conservation status as "stable".

In Ecuador there are reforestation programs for the palo santo tree. To reforest, the transplant method is used, which consists of determining an area of the forest that has overpopulation of the same species to extract the trees that are very close to each other and transfer them to an area of the forest where there are no trees so that they can continue their natural development. In this way, the space that remains when the trees are extracted will be used by other native species of the dry forest.

Uses

Ethnobotanical uses

The use of palo santo from B. graveolens is traditional in South America, especially in Peru and Ecuador. According to the local customs, it is used against  "mala energía" (bad energy; "Palo santo para limpiar tu casa de la mala energia, palo santo para la buena suerte" or "Palo santo to cleanse your house of bad energy, palo santo for good luck"), which may sometimes refer to clinical disease. Its use reportedly dates back to the Inca era. Palo santo is common today as a type of incense, which gives off an aroma reminiscent of baked apples or burnt sugar.

Palo santo oil was used during the time of the Incas for its reputed spiritual purifying properties. Today, palo santo oil may be applied to the body (such as at the base of the skull or on the spine) to increase relaxation, similar to aromatherapy.

Palo santo may be burned, similar to incense, by lighting shavings of palo santo wood. In Peru, a shaman, or medicine man, reportedly lights palo santo sticks and the rising smoke will enter the "energy field" of ritual participants to "clear misfortune, negative thoughtprints, and 'evil spirits'". Peruvians harvest fallen branches and twigs of the B. graveolens tree, a practice that is regulated by the government of Peru, so trees are not cut for wood harvesting. The charcoal of palo santo sticks can also be used for ritual smudging. Yoga studios and witchcraft practitioners utilize the substance.

Drinks
Palo santo wood has been used in the ageing of some beers, either as barrels, or simply as wood chips; stronger, darker beers being the preferred style for the wood to complement. Examples include Dogfish Head's Marron Brown Ale from the US, Stu Mostow's Palo Santo and Coconut Baltic Porter from Poland, and Pohjala's Baltic Porter Day 2022 from Estonia. Palo santo wood has also been used in brew barrels for whiskey. In Ecuador they drink palo santo tea.

References

External links

 Palo Santo reforestation program

graveolens
Medicinal plants of Central America
Medicinal plants of North America
Medicinal plants of South America
Trees of South America
Trees of Central America
Trees of Mexico
Plants described in 1824
Incense material
Trees of Peru